Pythium paroecandrum is a plant pathogen infecting carrots and impatiens.

References

External links
 Index Fungorum
 USDA ARS Fungal Database

Water mould plant pathogens and diseases
Carrot diseases
Ornamental plant pathogens and diseases
paroecandrum